Nikola Ćaćić and Denys Molchanov were the defending champions but chose not to participate.

Ruben Bemelmans and Daniel Masur won the title after defeating Enzo Couacaud and Blaž Rola 7–6(7–2), 6–4 in the final.

Seeds

Draw

References

External links
 Main draw

Bendigo International - Men's Doubles